Rhone can refer to:
Rhône, one of the major rivers of Europe, running through Switzerland and France
Rhône (department), a department in France along the river
Rhône Glacier, the source of the Rhone River and one of the primary contributors to Lake Geneva in the far eastern end of the canton of Valais in Switzerland
Rhone Glacier (Antarctica)
Rhône Group, a global private equity firm
Rhone Apparel, an American sportswear (activewear) company
Rhône wine, a wine grown in France
Le Rhône, a type of aircraft engine initially created in 1910 by Société des Moteurs Le Rhône
Gnome et Rhône (1915–1945), a French aircraft engine factory after merging Société des Moteurs Le Rhône
The RMS Rhone (1865–1867), a famous British shipwreck of Royal Mail Ship
Arthur Rhoné (1836–1910), an amateur French Egyptologist

See also
Rhodanien (disambiguation)